Suwarnaraj a/l Chinniah (born 3 February 1998) is a Malaysian footballer who plays as a right-back for Malaysia Super League club Penang.

References

External links
 

Living people
1998 births
Malaysian footballers
Malaysian people of Malay descent
Penang F.C. players
Association football defenders